Daniel Kersch (born 27 December 1961) is a Luxembourgish politician. , he serves as Minister of Sport and Minister of Labour, Employment and the Social and Solidarity Economy in the second Bettel–Schneider Ministry.

References 

Living people
1961 births
Place of birth missing (living people)
Deputy Prime Ministers of Luxembourg
Luxembourgian politicians
21st-century Luxembourgian politicians
Luxembourg Socialist Workers' Party politicians
World Anti-Doping Agency members